The Farranfore–Valentia Harbour line was a  long single-track broad gauge railway line that operated from 1892 to 1960 along Dingle Bay's southern shore in Ireland. It was the most westerly railway in Europe.

History 
A plan to extend the 1834 Dublin and Kingstown Railway to Valentia Harbour by that railway's engineer, Charles Blacker Vignoles, for the establishment of a transatlantic port, was to prove too ambitious and came to nothing. The Great Southern and Western Railway Company (GS&WR) had opened its  to  section in 1859, and in 1871 the independent Killorgan Railway company was formed to construct a line from the GS&WR  station but in the event was unable to raise the finance.

The branch line left the Mallow–Tralee line at Farranfore and headed west through some of Ireland's most spectacular scenery as it climbed through County Kerry's mountainous countryside, along Dingle Bay's southern shore. It served as the main transport system for the Iveragh Peninsula for 75 years. The last train departed Killorglin on 30 January 1960, and the line was closed on 1 February 1960.

The Laune Viaduct in Killorglin, two tunnels and the Gleensk Viaduct are still standing. Most of its other buildings have been demolished and their sites were used for other purposes. It was announced in June 2013 that the section of the disused and disassembled railway linking Cahirciveen to Reenard would be signed over by Irish Rail's parent company, CIÉ to Kerry County Council for building the  Fertha greenway, a combined walking and cycling path which features on Lonely Planet's best things to do in time.

Route 

The  extension ran to  where a ferry was available to Valentia Island. Kells at  also had a train passing loop and was succeeded by a  stretch of track to   further on.

The terminus at Valentia Harbour was a simple arrangement with a shed and no turntable, engines working the  back to Cahirciveen for stabling overnight.

Rolling stock

The first two 550 hp C Class  diesels, Nos. C201 and C202, were put to work on the branch on 4 March 1957, only just having arrived in Ireland at the start of the previous month, with CIÉ 2600 Class railcars also noted as having worked excursions to the branch.

Six-wheeled passenger coaches were used throughout the life of the line, its sharp curves meaning eight wheeled bogie coaches only being permitted past  after 1935, and only then if they had oval buffers or round buffers of not less than  diameter.

Services

Gallery

References

Notes

Footnotes

Sources

Further reading

External links 

 Photos on Flickr

Farranfore–Valentia Harbour line
Irish gauge railways
Closed railways in Ireland
Iveragh Peninsula